The following is a list of "L" codes for Medical Subject Headings (MeSH), as defined by the United States National Library of Medicine (NLM).

This list continues the information at List of MeSH codes (K01). Codes following these are found at List of MeSH codes (M01). For other MeSH codes, see List of MeSH codes.

The source for this content is the set of 2006 MeSH Trees from the NLM.

– information science

– book collecting

– chronology

– classification
  – phylogeny

– communication
  – advertising
  – answering services
  – communication barriers
  – computer literacy
  – cybernetics
  – feedback
  – diffusion of innovation
  – technology transfer
  – hotlines
  – Information dissemination
  – interdisciplinary communication
  – language
  – language arts
  – lipreading
  – multilingualism
  – reading
  – speech
  – translating
  – writing
  – authorship
  – correspondence
  – electronic mail
  – handwriting
  – paleography
  – shorthand
  – linguistics
  – terminology
  – names
  – abbreviations
  – anonyms and pseudonyms
  – eponyms
  – phonetics
  – psycholinguistics
  – neurolinguistic programming
  – semantics
  – vocabulary
  – negotiating
  – nonverbal communication
  – manual communication
  – sign language
  – persuasive communication
  – propaganda
  – reminder systems

– communications media
  – erotica
  – library materials
  – mass media
  – motion pictures
  – radio
  – television
  – videodisc recording
  – compact disks
  – CD-i
  – CD-ROM
  – videotape recording
  – publications
  – bibliography
  –  national bibliography
  – bibliography of medicine
  – bibliometrics
  – biobibliography
  – book reviews
  – books
  – book imprints
  – printers' marks
  – book ornamentation
  – bookplates
  –  illustrated books
  – incunabula
  – manuals
  – sex manuals
  – rare books
  – reference books
  – almanacs
  – atlases
  – dictionaries
  –  chemical dictionaries
  –  classical dictionaries
  –  dental dictionaries
  –  medical dictionaries
  –  pharmaceutic dictionaries
  –  polyglot dictionaries
  – directories
  – dispensatories
  – encyclopedias
  – formularies
  –  dental formularies
  –  homeopathic formularies
  –  hospital formularies
  – pharmacopoeias
  –  homeopathic pharmacopoeias
  –  medical reference books
  –  medical dictionaries
  – textbooks
  – broadsides
  – catalogs
  –  commercial catalogs
  –  booksellers' catalogs
  –  publishers' catalogs
  –  drug catalogs
  –  library catalogs
  –  union catalogs
  –  academic dissertations
  – government publications
  – manuscripts
  –  medical manuscripts
  – pamphlets
  – review literature
  – consensus development conferences
  –  nih consensus development conferences
  – serial publications
  – newspapers
  – periodicals
  – translations
  – teaching materials
  – audiovisual aids
  – exhibits
  – maps
  – medical illustration
  –  structural models
  –  anatomic models
  – manikins
  – visible human project
  – motion pictures
  – multimedia
  – optical storage devices
  – videodisc recording
  – compact disks
  – CD-i
  – CD-ROM
  – radio
  – tape recording
  – videotape recording
  – television
  –  video microscopy
  – videodisc recording
  – compact disks
  – CD-i
  – CD-ROM
  – videotape recording
  – manuals
  – sex manuals
  – textbooks
  – telecommunications
  – electronic mail
  – radar
  – radio
  – satellite communications
  – telefacsimile
  – telemedicine
  – remote consultation
  – telepathology
  – teleradiology
  – telephone
  – answering services
  – cellular phone
  – modems
  – television
  –  video microscopy
  – videoconferencing

– computer security

– computing methodologies
  – algorithms
  – artificial intelligence
  – expert systems
  – fuzzy logic
  – knowledge bases
  – natural language processing
  – neural networks (computer)
  – robotics
  – automatic data processing
  – punched-card systems
  – computer graphics
  – computer-aided design
  – computer simulation
  – computer systems
  – computer communication networks
  – internet
  – local area networks
  – computers
  – computer peripherals
  – computer storage devices
  – optical storage devices
  – compact disks
  – CD-i
  – CD-ROM
  – computer terminals
  – modems
  –  analog computers
  –  hybrid computers
  – analog-to-digital conversion
  –  mainframe computers
  –  molecular computers
  – microcomputers
  –  handheld computers
  – minicomputers
  –  molecular computers
  –  computer-assisted image processing
  – data compression
  – image enhancement
  – radiographic image enhancement
  –  dual-energy scanned projection radiography
  –  three-dimensional imaging
  – mathematical computing
  – decision support techniques
  –  statistical data interpretation
  – decision theory
  – decision trees
  – neural networks (computer)
  – nomograms
  –  computer-assisted numerical analysis
  –  computer-assisted signal processing
  – data compression
  – software
  – database management systems
  – grateful med
  – hypermedia
  – programming languages
  – software design
  – software validation
  – speech recognition software
  – user-computer interface
  – video games
  – word processing

– copying processes
  – microfilming
  – tape recording
  – videotape recording
  – telefacsimile
  – video recording
  – videodisc recording
  – compact disks
  – CD-i
  – CD-ROM
  – videotape recording

– data collection
  – geriatric assessment
  – interviews
  – focus groups
  – narration
  – questionnaires
  – delphi technique
  – records
  – birth certificates
  – death certificates
  – dental records
  – hospital records
  – medical records
  – medical record linkage
  –  problem-oriented medical records
  –  computerized medical records systems
  – trauma severity indices
  – abbreviated injury scale
  – glasgow coma scale
  – glasgow outcome scale
  – injury severity score
  – nursing records
  – registries
  – seer program
  – vital statistics
  – life expectancy
  – life tables
  – quality-adjusted life years
  – morbidity
  – basic reproduction number
  – incidence
  – prevalence
  – mortality
  – cause of death
  – child mortality
  – fatal outcome
  – fetal mortality
  – hospital mortality
  – infant mortality
  – maternal mortality
  – survival rate
  – pregnancy rate
  – birth rate

– data display
  – computer graphics
  – computer-aided design

– informatics
  – dental informatics
  – medical informatics
  – nursing informatics
  – public health informatics

– information centers
  – archives
  – libraries
  –  dental libraries
  –  digital libraries
  –  hospital libraries
  –  medical libraries
  – national library of medicine (u.s.)
  –  nursing libraries

– information management

– information services
  – bibliography
  –  descriptive bibliography
  – bibliography of medicine
  – bibliometrics
  – biobibliography
  –  bibliographic databases
  – book selection
  – documentation
  – abstracting and indexing
  – cataloging
  – book classification
  – classification
  – filing
  – molecular sequence data
  – amino acid sequence
  – base sequence
  – carbohydrate sequence
  –  controlled vocabulary
  – Current Procedural Terminology
  – diagnostic and statistical manual of mental disorders
  – healthcare common procedure coding system
  – International Classification of Disease
  – Logical Observation Identifiers Names and Codes
  – subject headings
  – medical subject headings
  – Systematized Nomenclature of Medicine
  – Unified Medical Language System
  – drug information services
  – adverse drug reaction reporting systems
  – clinical pharmacy information systems
  – human genome project
  – library services
  – interlibrary loans
  – library technical services
  – cataloging
  – book classification

– information storage and retrieval
  – data compression
  – databases
  –  bibliographic databases
  – PubMed
  – MEDLINE
  –  factual databases
  –  genetic databases
  –  nucleic acid databases
  –  protein databases
  – geographic information systems
  – national practitioner data bank
  – visible human project

– information theory

– library science
  – library administration
  – library associations
  – library automation
  – library collection development
  – library schools
  – library services
  – interlibrary loans
  – library surveys
  – library technical services

– medical informatics
  – medical informatics applications
  –  computer-assisted decision making
  –  computer-assisted diagnosis
  –  computer-assisted image interpretation
  –  computer-assisted radiographic image interpretation
  –  computer-assisted therapy
  –  computer-assisted drug therapy
  –  computer-assisted radiotherapy
  –  conformal radiotherapy
  –  intensity-modulated radiotherapy
  –  computer-assisted radiotherapy planning
  –  computer-assisted surgery
  – information storage and retrieval
  – grateful med
  – MEDLARS
  – MEDLINE
  – MedlinePlus
  – PubMed
  – MEDLINE
  – information systems
  – clinical laboratory information systems
  – community networks
  –  clinical decision support systems
  – databases
  –  bibliographic databases
  – PubMed
  – MEDLINE
  –  factual databases
  –  genetic databases
  –  nucleic acid databases
  –  protein databases
  – national practitioner data bank
  – visible human project
  – geographic information systems
  – hospital information systems
  – medical order entry systems
  – integrated advanced information management systems
  – knowledge bases
  – management information systems
  – ambulatory care information systems
  – clinical laboratory information systems
  – clinical pharmacy information systems
  – database management systems
  –  management decision support systems
  – healthcare common procedure coding system
  – hospital information systems
  – medical order entry systems
  – operating room information systems
  – personnel staffing and scheduling information systems
  – radiology information systems
  –  computerized medical records systems
  – medical order entry systems
  – MEDLARS
  – MEDLINE
  – online systems
  –  digital libraries
  – PubMed
  – MEDLINE
  – radiology information systems
  – reminder systems
  – medical informatics computing

– pattern recognition, automated
  – neural networks (computer)

– publishing
  – book industry
  – bookbinding
  – bookselling
  – book prices
  – copyright
  – duplicate publication
  – editorial policies
  – journalism
  –  dental journalism
  –  medical journalism
  –  research peer review
  – plagiarism
  – printing
  – publication bias
  – retraction of publication

– systems analysis
  – operations research
  – monte carlo method
  – probability theory
  –  linear programming
  – systems integration

The list continues at List of MeSH codes (M01).

L01